Stephen Pool Waltrip High School is a public high school located at 1900 West 34th Street in Houston, Texas, United States, 77018.

Waltrip, which serves grades 9 through 12, is a part of the Houston Independent School District.

Waltrip has Houston ISD's Research and Technology magnet program.

The school's namesake is a former principal at the defunct Houston Heights High School, who transferred to Reagan High School (now renamed Heights High School) after that school replaced the original Houston Heights High.

History

Waltrip High School opened in 1960 to serve many newly developed post-World War II subdivisions, and relieved Reagan High School of many students when it did so. It was relieved by Scarborough Junior-Senior High School when that school opened in 1969. The school was named after Stephen Pool Waltrip, a funeral home owner in the Houston Heights named  principal of Reagan High School in 1918.

The school remained majority white until the  early 1990s, when the school was equally white, black, and Hispanic.

In 1997 a portion of the Reagan High School boundary was rezoned to Waltrip. By the 2000s, Waltrip became majority Hispanic.

Waltrip has become one of the highest performing comprehensive high schools in Houston ISD by being named "Recognized" by the Texas Education Agency, one of the few urban high schools in Houston ISD to receive such a designation.  (Reference:  Texas Education Agency website).

Around 2012, each year a total of 400 students transfer from Booker T. Washington High School to Waltrip and Reagan.

In 2015 Andria Schur got a job as the principal of a charter school in Dallas, Texas, causing her to leave her post as principal of Waltrip. Dale Mitchell, previously the principal of Sterling High School, became the principal of Waltrip.

The campus began receiving a renovation around 2015.

School song
The Waltrip school song, "Our Waltrip High", was written by alumni Jon Enloe with music by Joe Stuessy, both from the Class of 1961.

Neighborhoods served by Waltrip
Neighborhoods served by Waltrip include Garden Oaks, Timbergrove Manor (Timbergrove Manor Civic Club and Timbergrove Manor Neighborhood Association), Shepherd Forest, Shepherd Park Plaza, Lazybrook, Shady Acres, most of Oak Forest, most of Cottage Grove, Candlelight Plaza and a small portion of the Houston Heights.

A townhome complex called Cottage Grove is zoned to Waltrip.

At one point, all of the Houston Heights was zoned to Reagan. In 1997, a small portion was rezoned to Waltrip.

Student body
As of 2006, the student body  is predominantly Hispanic.

The makeup of the 1,808 students enrolled during the 2008-2009 school year was:
 67% Hispanic
 17% White
 14% Black
 <1% Asian
 <1% Native American

Approximately 73% of the students qualified for free or reduced lunch programs.

Athletics

The Athletics Department at Waltrip consists of the following teams:
Football
Basketball (Boys and Girls)
Baseball
Softball
Golf (Boys and Girls)
Track & Field (Boys and Girls)
Volleyball
Soccer (Boys and Girls)
Swimming (Boys and Girls)
Tennis (Boys and Girls)
Cheerleading (Boys and Girls)

Margaret Downing of the Houston Press stated in 2012 that the school culture placed importance on American football.

Facilities
In 2012 it housed the Waltrip High School Child Development Center, a preschool program for low income children. Since 2015 it no longer does so.

Academic performance
The Texas Education Agency rankings in 2009-2010 and 2011 were "Recognized" and "Academically Acceptable". Downing stated in 2012 that "Waltrip High is neither the worst nor the best high school in HISD."

Dress code
Collared shirt (appropriate fit, NOT revealing), college shirt, or Waltrip spirit shirt.
Blue jeans (NOT ripped, bleached, nor colors), solid khaki - pants, capris, or knee-length shorts (must touch/reach knee).
Solid hoody or Waltrip hoody allowed.

Feeder patterns
Elementary schools that feed into Waltrip  include:
Durham 
Oak Forest 
Sinclair 
Stevens 
Garden Oaks  (partial)
Helms  (partial)
Highland Heights  (partial)
Love  (partial)
Memorial  (partial)
Stevenson  (partial)

Middle schools that feed into Waltrip include:
Frank Black  (partial)
Hamilton  (partial)
Williams  (partial)

Notable alumni

 Mark Calaway (Class of 1983) - Retired WWE professional wrestler known as The Undertaker.
 Keenan McCardell (Class of 1988) - Professional American football wide receiver coach for the Minnesota Vikings
 Shelley Duvall (Class of 1967) - Producer and retired actress 
 Toni Lawrence - Former Houston City Councilwoman 
Denzel Livingston (Class of 2011), basketball player for Hapoel Kfar Saba of the Israeli Liga Leumit
 Debra Maffett (Class of 1975) - Miss America 1983.
 Van Malone (Class of 1988) - Professional American football player for the Detroit Lions and college football coach
 Anita "Sweetie" Marbury (Class of 1965) - Mayor of Durango, Colorado
 Barbara Olson (Class of 1974) - Conservative commentator and September 11, 2001 attacks victim 
 Patrick Swayze (Class of 1971) - Actor and dancer.
 John H. Whitmire (Class of 1967) - A Texas senator
 Danny Ward - Acclaimed musician and event producer
 Elizabeth Pena and Jenny Ertman - murder victims - Waltrip High School contains a memorial to the girls

References

Further reading
 Dr. Enloe, Jon. "Community energy needed for Waltrip resurgence" (Archive" (Archive) (editorial). The Leader. September 5, 2013.

External links

 Waltrip High School
 

Houston Independent School District high schools
Educational institutions established in 1960
Public high schools in Houston
Magnet schools in Houston
1960 establishments in Texas